Van Leer Packaging is a packaging company which had 17,000 employees and generated more than 2 billion in sales globally. In May 1999, Royal Packaging Industries Van Leer N.V was acquired by rival Huhtamäki.

History
Van Leer Packaging was founded in 1919 by Bernard van Leer. Working in post World War I, Bernard started a small factory outside of Amsterdam. Van Leer Packaging then expanded into the industrial packaging field and received its first breakthrough in 1925 for a large steel drum order from the Shell Oil Company. By 1997 it is reported to have generated over $4.75 billion and post steady profit growth. In 1999, Huhtamäki acquired Van Leer Packaging for about $1 billion.

Van Leer Group Foundation 
After the acquisition of Royal Packaging Industries Van Leer, The Van Leer Group created the Bernard Van Leer Foundation, which funds the Jerusalem Film Centre and the Van Leer Jerusalem Institute.

See also
 List of largest companies of the Netherlands

References

External links
Van Leer Group Foundation history

Manufacturing companies established in 1919
Companies based in Amsterdam
Van Leer family
1999 mergers and acquisitions